Teretiopsis levicarinatus is a species of sea snail, a marine gastropod mollusk in the family Raphitomidae.

Description
The length of the shell attains 10.7 mm, its diameter (with broken outer lip) 6.4 mm.

Distribution
This marine species was found off Liberia at a depth of 2,800 m.

References

External links
  Kantor, Yu.I. & Sysoev, A.S. (1989) The morphology of toxoglossan gastropods lacking a radula, with a description of a new species and genus of Turridae. Journal of Molluscan Studies, 55, 537–550
 

levicarinatus
Gastropods described in 1989